Jordan Davis (born 1970 in New York City) is an American poet. He is one of the Flarf poets. He is poetry editor of The Nation.

Life
He graduated from Columbia College, where he studied with Kenneth Koch.
He was editor of The Poetry Project Newsletter. In 1998, he founded The Hat, with Christopher Edgar.

His work appeared in Poetry, Boston Review, and 3:AM Magazine.

Works
 Million Poems Journal, Faux, 2003, 
 Shell Game, Edge Books, 2018, 
Co-edited 
 Free Radicals: American Poets Before Their First Books, Subpress, 2004,  
 The Collected Poems of Kenneth Koch, Knopf, 2005. 
 P.O.D. (Poems On Demand), Greying Ghost. 2011.

References

External links
Poet's website

American male poets
1970 births
Living people
Poets from New York (state)
The Nation (U.S. magazine) people
Columbia College (New York) alumni
21st-century American poets
21st-century American male writers